The 32nd G8 summit was held on 15–17 July 2006 in Saint Petersburg, Russia. The venue was the Constantine Palace, which is located in Strelna on the Gulf of Finland. This was the first time Russia served as host nation for a G8 summit; and the nation's status as a full member of the G8 was confirmed.

Overview
The Group of Seven (G7) is a forum which brings together the heads of the countries: France, Germany, Italy, Japan, the United Kingdom, the United States and Canada starting in 1976. The G8, meeting for the first time in 1997, was formed with the addition of Russia. In addition, the President of the European Commission has been formally included in summits since 1981. The summits were not meant to be linked formally with wider international institutions; and in fact, a mild rebellion against the stiff formality of other international meetings was a part of the genesis of cooperation between France's President Giscard d'Estaing and West Germany's Chancellor Helmut Schmidt as they conceived the initial summit of the Group of Six (G6) in 1975.

The G8 summits during the 21st century have inspired widespread debates, protests and demonstrations; and the two- or three-day event becomes more than the sum of its parts, elevating the participants, the issues and the venue as focal points for activist pressure.

Composition of summit leaders

The G8 is an annual forum for the leaders of Canada, the European Commission, France, Germany, Italy, Japan, Russia, the United Kingdom and the United States.

The 32nd G8 summit was the first summit for Canadian Prime Minister Stephen Harper and German Chancellor Angela Merkel. It was also the last summit for French President Jacques Chirac and Japanese Prime Minister Junichiro Koizumi.

Participants
These summit participants are the current "core members" of the international forum:

Priorities

Traditionally, the host country of the G8 summit sets the agenda for negotiations, which take place primarily amongst multi-national civil servants in the weeks before the summit itself, leading to a joint declaration which all countries can agree to sign. Energy security, education, and the fight against infectious diseases were the main issues, with the conflict between Israel and Lebanon also attracting the attention of world leaders.

Issues
The summit was intended as a venue for resolving differences among its members. As a practical matter, the summit was also conceived as an opportunity for its members to give each other mutual encouragement in the face of difficult economic decisions. This summit was primarily an economic forum for the global economic powerhouses; and the focus of this G8 Summit was discussion of economic issues. Some of the pressing items on the agenda:
 Open trade between Russia and the United States, including discussion of Russian entry into the World Trade Organization
 Multibillion-dollar aircraft manufacturing contracts, in light of strategy shifts at Airbus and Boeing and worsening airline business performance
 Free energy markets, especially regarding Russia and former Soviet republics, as well as petroleum from the Middle East
 Nigeria, Venezuela, and the Persian Gulf regions have all had reduced energy exports in the past weeks due to various political and technical issues
 Rights for exploration and exploitation of natural gas in Russia and the North Atlantic Ocean / Baltic Sea
 Alternative energy forms, especially relaxing nuclear power regulations; and development of hydrogen as an economically viable energy platform
 Security – both militarily and financially ensuring the future in energy supplies
 Discussion of economic impacts of global instability, drugs, and terrorism
 Education priorities for developed nations, especially encouraging businesses to support education
 Global system to monitor and contain infectious diseases

Israel–Lebanon crisis
The agenda set up by Russian President Vladimir Putin was largely overshadowed by the continuing violence in Israel and Lebanon. On 16 July, the leaders of the G8 nations agreed on a statement calling for an end to the fighting and the release of the Israeli soldiers. The leaders did not, however, go as far as calling for a ceasefire.

Citizens' responses and authorities' counter-responses
During the week leading up to the summit (7–11 July), police in Moscow, St Petersburg and elsewhere around Russia detained somewhere between a few dozen to possibly two hundred human rights and political activists. Many of them were sentenced to ten days' imprisonment, preventing them from participating in protests surrounding the official summit. The Russian Deputy Internal Minister Alexander Chekalin said that the allegations of harassment were "from the realms of supposition" and that the police's actions were "commensurate with the situation at hand".

Cherie Blair, wife of the British Prime Minister and a human rights lawyer, slipped out of the summit in order to meet with local human rights groups and offer them free legal advice. Her leaving the summit was officially endorsed by Downing Street, and has reportedly furthered a rift between Britain and Russia.

Accomplishments
The G8 summit is an international event which is observed and reported by news media, but the G8's continuing relevance after more than 30 years is somewhat unclear. More than one analyst suggests that a G-8 summit is not the place to flesh out the details of any difficult or controversial policy issue in the context of a three-day event. Rather, the meeting offers an opportunity to bring a range of complex and sometimes inter-related issues. The G8 summit brings leaders together "not so they can dream up quick fixes, but to talk and think about them together."

Infrastructure Consortium for Africa
The Infrastructure Consortium for Africa (ICA) was established at the 31st G8 summit at Gleneagles, Scotland in the United Kingdom in 2005. Since that time, the ICA's annual meeting is traditionally hosted by the country holding the Presidency of the G8—in Germany in 2006.

Recorded conversations

During the summit, a conversation between President George W. Bush and Prime Minister Tony Blair was inadvertently recorded by a U.S. TV crew preparing for a live broadcast.

The UK's Independent newspaper put a transcript of the conversation on its front page on 18 July, alongside some notes explaining the context of some of the comments; and the news story was widely disseminated by the international media. The paper singled out Bush's apparent snub of an offer by Blair to mediate in the 2006 Israel–Lebanon conflict, in favour of sending Condoleezza Rice. While Britons were upset with the perception that Blair was subordinate to Bush, in the US the fact that Bush used an expletive (claiming the 2006 Israel–Lebanon conflict would not have escalated if Syria would have pressured the Hezbollah to "stop doing this shit") was of greater concern.

Business opportunity
For some, the G8 summit became a profit-generating event; as for example, the official G8 Summit magazines which have been published under the auspices of the host nations for distribution to all attendees since 1998.

Controversial Massage 
During one meeting at the summit on 17 July, with all of the heads of state seated at a roundtable, President George W. Bush walked around the table to the position behind German Chancellor Angela Merkel's chair, reached out his hands to Merkel's shoulders and started to give her a massage. Merkel quickly raised her hands in protest and Bush immediately withdrew his hands and resumed walking around the table. A video of the massage became a hit on YouTube, where many commentators likened it to sexual harassment.

Gallery

Core G8 participants

Notes

References

External links

 Official G8 website: St. Petersburg summit, 2006; n.b., no official website is created for any G7 summit prior to 1995 – see the 21st G7 summit.
 University of Toronto: G8 Research Group, G8 Information Centre
 G8 2006, delegations & documents

Press and media
 BBC News: Russian WTO bid falters at summit
 Business Finance News: G8 SUMMIT At-a-glance guide to the main points
 Russian roulette policing methods
 G8 2006 Info- and Pressgroup
 G8 research group "G8 Live" Live news and blogs from St. Petersburg summit by University of Toronto student members of the G8 Research Group
 Medish, Mark. "Russia — Odd Man Out in the G-8", The Globalist, 24 February 2006
 Oxford Energy Comment. "The G8 and Russia: Security of Supply vs. Security of Demand?", Oxford Institute for Energy Studies, August 2006

Activism
 Russia Indymedia Coverage English language reporting from the protests against the summit
 "Call for Action against the G8 + 5 Climate Summit: October 3–4 in Mexico City"
 "G8 St.Petersburg, Russia"
 "G8 Summit 2006, St.Petersburg, Russia" (Plentyfact wiki)
 Activist mobilisation against the summit
 Activists' preparations
 2006 G8 Summit – Chronicle of Global Resistance
 2006 G8 Summit – Protest Reports & Photos
 Network Against G8 Saint-Petersburg

2006
G8 summit
G8 summit 2006
G8 summit 2006
G8 summit
G8 summit
2006 in Saint Petersburg
July 2006 events in Europe